Nationality words link to articles with information on the nation's poetry or literature (for instance, Irish or France).

Events
 March – The Scriblerus Club, an informal group of literary friends, is formed by Jonathan Swift, Alexander Pope, John Gay, John Arbuthnot (at whose London house they meet), Thomas Parnell, Henry St. John and Robert Harley.
 End – Venetian sea-captain Julije Balović begins compilation of the Perast Chronicle, a collection of epic poetry.

Works published

United Kingdom

 John Danforth (poet), "A Poem, Upon the Much Honoured [...] Mrs. Maria Mather", English, Colonial America
 William Diaper, An Imitation of the Seventeenth Epistle of the First Book of Horace
 Laurence Eusden, A Letter to Mr. Addison, on the King's Accession to the Throne
 Abel Evans, Prae-existence: A poem, in imitation of Milton
 John Gay:
 The Shepherd's Week (pastoral)
 The Fan
 Samuel Jones, Poetical Miscellanies on Several Occasions
 Alexander Pope, The Rape of the Lock: An heroi-comical poem, first edition in an enlarged, five-canto form (see also Miscellaneoous Poems and Translations 1712
 Nicholas Rowe, Poems on Several Occasions
 Richard Steele:
 Editor, Poetical Miscellanies, including pieces by Alexander Pope, Thomas Parnell, Thomas Tickell, John Gay, Thomas Warton, Edward Young and Richard Steele himself
 Editor, "Written by a lady", The Ladies Library, anthology sometimes attributed to Mary Wray, to Steele and to George Berkeley
 Jonathan Swift, The First Ode of the Second Book of Horace Paraphras'd, published this year, although the book states "1713"
 John Wilmot, Earl of Rochester, The Works of John Earl of Rochester. Containing Poems, On Several Occasions: His Lordship's Letters To Mr. Savil and Mrs. * * with Valentinian, a Tragedy. Never before Publish'd together, London: Printed for Jacob Tonson, posthumous

Other
 Antoine Houdart de La Motte, an "improved" version of Homer's Iliad, with a preface critical of the poet; France

Births
Death years link to the corresponding "[year] in poetry" article:
 January 1 – Kristijonas Donelaitis (died 1780), Lithuanian poet
 November 13 – William Shenstone (died 1763, English poet)
 Date not known:
 Rob Donn (died 1778), Scottish Gaelic poet
 Georg Luis (died 1792), German poet
 Elias Caspar Reichard (died 1791), German poet

Deaths
Birth years link to the corresponding "[year] in poetry" article:
 June 25 (buried) – Walter Pope (born 1627), English astronomer and poet
 November 29 – Jerolim Kavanjin (born 1641), Croatian poet
 Nozawa Bonchō 野沢 凡兆 (born c. 1640), Japanese haikai poet
 Benjamin Tompson (born 1642), English Colonial American poet

See also

Poetry
List of years in poetry
List of years in literature
 18th century in poetry
 18th century in literature
 Augustan poetry
 Scriblerus Club

Notes

 "A Timeline of English Poetry" Web page of the Representative Poetry Online Web site, University of Toronto

18th-century poetry
Poetry